Steven James Falteisek (born January 28, 1972) is a former Major League Baseball pitcher. Falteisek was drafted in the tenth round of the 1992 Major League Baseball Draft by the Montreal Expos. He would reach the Major League level with the team in 1997. In 1998, Falteisek signed as a free agent with the Milwaukee Brewers and would make his final Major League appearance during his time with the team. After the Brewers cut him in 1999, Falteisek signed with the Cleveland Indians organization in 2000. Later that same year, he was traded to the Florida Marlins organization for minor league player Victor Martinez.

Falteisek played at the collegiate level at the University of South Alabama.

References

External links
, or Retrosheet
Pura Pelota (Venezuelan Winter League)

1972 births
Living people
American expatriate baseball players in Canada
Baseball players from New York (state)
Bowie Baysox players
Burlington Bees players
Calgary Cannons players
Harrisburg Senators players
Jacksonville Suns players
Jamestown Expos players
Las Vegas 51s players
Long Island Ducks players
Major League Baseball pitchers
Milwaukee Brewers players
Montreal Expos players
Ottawa Lynx players
People from Mineola, New York
Somerset Patriots players
South Alabama Jaguars baseball players
Tiburones de La Guaira players
American expatriate baseball players in Venezuela
West Palm Beach Expos players